John (or Teone) Topi Patuki (1866–1945) was a member of the New Zealand Legislative Council from 7 May 1918 to 6 May 1925, when his term ended. He was appointed by the Reform Government.

He was from Ruapuke Island in Foveaux Strait.

References 

1866 births
1945 deaths
Members of the New Zealand Legislative Council
Reform Party (New Zealand) MLCs
Māori MLCs
People from Ruapuke Island